2CC is a commercial radio station on the AM band in Canberra, Australia. It began broadcasting on 1210 kHz in 1975 changing to 1206 kHz in 1978. It is jointly owned by Capital Radio Network and Grant Broadcasters.

History
2CC, which began broadcasting in 1975, was Canberra's second commercial radio station. 2CC continued its dominance over Canberra's other commercial radio station, 2CA, throughout the latter half of the 1970s and most of the 1980s. In 1988, KIX106  and FM 104 went to air as supplementary FM licences. KIX106 was a supplementary licence of 2CC, and FM 104.7 a supplementary licence of 2CA. In the mid-1990s, ARN (owner of 2CC and Mix 106.3) and Austereo (owner of 2CA and 104.7) merged to form a joint venture ownership of both FM stations, selling  2CC and 2CA to the Capital Radio Network. In 2004, 50% ownership of 2CC and 2CA was sold to Grant Broadcasters. Currently, 2CC broadcasts a news talk format with some of Australia's best known and highest rating presenters, such as Ray Hadley and Alan Jones.

The broadcast range of the 5,000 watt transmitter covers Canberra and the Southern tablelands region of NSW including Yass, Queanbeyan and Bungendore. The 5,000 watt AM signal travels as far as Cowra, Gundagai, Goulburn, Cooma and Braidwood. 2CC also broadcasts from Black Mountain Tower in Digital (DAB+) and streams its program on its website at www.2cc.net.au as well as other streaming platforms.

2CC was originally located on Bellenden St in Crace, before moving to Hoskins St in Mitchell. The AM towers are located near the original studio building.

In August 2019, 2CC and its sister station 2CA, moved into a multi-million dollar state of the art broadcast centre (Canberra Radio Centre) directly next door to 2CC's old original premises on Bellenden St, Crace.

Programming

Local content
2CC broadcasts Canberra's only commercial talkback format. Local breakfast with Stephen Cenatiempo. However, the majority of 2CC's daytime and nightime programming is syndicated from Sydney with programs hosted by Ray Hadley, Deborah Knight, John Stanley and Michael McLaren. 2CC airs a three-hour afternoon program from 3pm with Leon Delaney. Weekend programs include Life and Technology on Saturday at midday, House of Wellness on Sunday at midday and Healthy Living on Sunday night.

Local programming on weekends include Garden Gurus, Trading Post, Pet Tales, Canberra Weekender and Sunday Roast from 9.00am to 12.00pm hosted by Chris McLengahan, Eddie Williams, Pete Davidson and Ian Meikle, as well garden experts Paulene Cairnduff and Keith Colls, vets Nonna Green, Lucy Fish and pet behaviorist Heike Hahner.

News
2CC provides a 24-hour news service. Its own, locally based, Capital Radio News Service provides news bulletins from 5.30am every half-hour during its breakfast show and then hourly from 9.00am - 6.00pm Monday to Friday. It broadcasts locally based half-hourly news bulletins from 6.00am - 9.00am (then hourly till midday) on Saturday and Sunday mornings.

Overnight hourly news bulletins are supplied by Macquarie National News.

Sport
During the rugby league season, The Continuous Call Team is broadcast from 2GB each Friday night, Saturday and Sunday with live NRL action.

References

External links 

Radio stations in Canberra
Radio stations established in 1975
News and talk radio stations in Australia
Capital Radio Network
Grant Broadcasters